Longhua District may refer to the following districts in the People's Republic of China:

 Longhua District, Shenzhen (龙华区), in Shenzhen, Guangdong
 Longhua District, Haikou (龙华区), in Haikou, Hainan